Dragobrašte is a village in the Vinica region of the North Macedonia. The population engages primarily in agriculture, particularly the cultivation of tobacco.

Demographics
According to the 2002 census, the village had a total of 392 inhabitants. Ethnic groups in the village include:

Macedonians 392

References

Villages in Vinica Municipality, North Macedonia